The Para Sport - Men's 1500 metres (T54) at the 2010 Commonwealth Games as part of the athletics programme was held at the Jawaharlal Nehru Stadium on Sunday 10 October 2010.

Results

External links
2010 Commonwealth Games - Athletics

Men's 1500 metres (T54)